Ethmia kutisi is a moth in the family Depressariidae. It is found in Florida, United States.

References

Moths described in 1991
kutisi